This is a list of the fungus Serpula species.

Species

   
 
  
 Serpula americana
 Serpula arizonica 
 Serpula atrovirens
 Serpula aurea
 Serpula borealis
 Serpula byssoidea 
 Serpula chlorina
 Serpula costaricensis
 Serpula crassa 
 Serpula destruens
 Serpula domestica
 Serpula elliottii
 Serpula erecta 
 Serpula eurocephala 
 Serpula fugax
 Serpula fusca
 Serpula fuscescens
 Serpula hexagonoides 
 Serpula himantioides
 Serpula illudens
 Serpula imperfecta
 Serpula incrassata
 Serpula lacrymans
 Serpula luridochracea
 Serpula minor 
 Serpula mollusca
 Serpula montana
 Serpula olivacea 
 Serpula olivascens 
 Serpula panuoides
 Serpula papyracea 
 Serpula pinastri 
 Serpula porinoides 
 Serpula pulverulenta 
 Serpula romellii
 Serpula rufa 
 Serpula rugospora
 Serpula sclerotiorum
 Serpula serpens
 Serpula similis
 Serpula sororia
 Serpula squalida 
 Serpula terrestris
 Serpula tignicola 
 Serpula umbrina

References

Boletales
Serpula species, List of